
Gmina Świecie nad Osą is a rural gmina (administrative district) in Grudziądz County, Kuyavian-Pomeranian Voivodeship, in north-central Poland.

Villages
Gmina Świecie nad Osą contains the villages and settlements of Białobłoty, Bursztynowo, Dębniaki, Karolewo, Kitnówko, Linowo, Lisewo-Zamek, Lisnówko, Lisnowo, Mędrzyce, Nowy Młyn, Partęczyny, Rychnowo, Świecie nad Osą, Szarnoś and Widlice.

Neighbouring gminas
Gmina Świecie nad Osą is bordered by the gminas of Biskupiec, Gruta, Jabłonowo Pomorskie, Książki, Łasin and Radzyń Chełmiński.

References
Polish official population figures 2006

Swiecie nad Osa
Grudziądz County